Fast 'n' Bulbous – A Tribute to Captain Beefheart was an album released by Imaginary Records in the UK in 1988, consisting of contemporary artists performing cover versions of songs by Captain Beefheart.

Track listing
Dog Faced Hermans - "Zig Zag Wanderer"
XTC - "Ella Guru"
The Scientists - "Clear Spot"
The Membranes - "Ice Cream for Crow"
The King of Luxembourg - "Long Necked Bottles"
The Beat Poets - "Sun Zoom Spark"
That Petrol Emotion - "Hot Head"
Primevals - "China Pig"
Sonic Youth - "Electricity"
Good and Gone - "Harry Irene"
The Screaming Dizbusters - "Frying Pan"
The Mock Turtles - "Big Eyed Beans from Venus"
The Beat Poets - "Gimme Dat Harp Boy"
Primevals - "Crazy Little Thing"

References

Tribute albums
Captain Beefheart
1988 compilation albums
Alternative rock compilation albums
Imaginary Records compilation albums